Cotana affinis is a moth in the family Eupterotidae. It was described by Walter Rothschild in 1917. It is found in New Guinea.

Description 
The wingspan is about 50 mm. The basal one-third of the forewings is cream white with an oblique subbasal chocolate band and a broad dark-chocolate antemedian band. In between these two bands is a chocolate stigma with a white centre. The outer two-thirds of the wing are creamy grey washed with brown and with a postmedian cream-grey band edged outwardly by a crenulated chocolate hairline. There is also a large chocolate patch above vein 6. The hindwings are orange yellow, but bright orange at the base and on the inner area. There are two faint transverse shadow lines.

References

Moths described in 1917
Eupterotinae